Artisan is the thirteenth studio album recorded by the Japanese singer-songwriter Tatsuro Yamashita.  It was released in June 1991, led by a string of hit singles he produced. Artisan became his first album that was not released on LP. Like his 1989 live album Joy, illustration for a front cover of Artisan was drawn by Andre Miripolsky, who painted a cover art of Bette Midler's 1983 No Frills album. It debuted at the No. 1 on the Oricon, and spent 20 weeks on chart with sales of over 710,000 copies in total. In December 1991, the album won the 33rd Japan Record Awards for "Best Pop/Rock Album" and "Excellent Albums" prizes.

Songs and composition
"Endless Game" was featured as the theme for a TV drama Yūwaku aired on TBS in 1990. It was released as a single in April 1990, and became his third top-5 hit as a performer on the Japanese Oricon singles chart. Also in the same year, Yamashita contributed a song "Without You" for Debbie Gibson, which was issued as a Japan-only single and the bonus disc for Japanese edition of her third album Anything is Possible.  Yamashita rewrote the song and recorded by himself, under the title "Sayonara Natsu no Hi". His rendition of the song was released as the second lead single for Artisan in May 1991. It gained a similar commercial success to its predecessor, though it couldn't reach the top-ten.

The lead-off track of Artisan is a song dedicated to the late Osamu Tezuka, a Japanese manga artist who died in 1989 ("Atom" is a protagonist for Astro Boy, one of Tezuka's most prominent works). In 1992, it was released as the fourth single from the album. He also sings of a painting Rain, Steam and Speed - The Great Western Railway by J. M. W. Turner on the third track entitled "Turner's Steamroller" which similarly became a single. Fifth track of the album is a cover version of "New York is a Lonely Town", a song written by Anders/Poncia and recorded by their group The Trade Winds. Yamashita interpreted the mid-1960s U.S. top-40 charting hit, slightly changing the part of the lyrics. On the eighth track, Yamashita's spouse Mariya Takeuchi wrote the lyrics to his composition. Aside from "Mighty Smile", the couple wrote three songs together for Masayuki Suzuki's second solo album Radio Days in 1988. Among them, Yamashita recorded "Misty Mauve" for Artisan, although it was not released until 2002 on his  Rarities album. The closing track of Artisan is a cover version of The Young Rascals' 1967 U.S. number-one hit. It has been also the ending theme for Sunday Songbook, a weekly radio program that Yamashita has hosted since 1992.

Track listing
All songs written and composed by Tatsuro Yamashita, except where indicated
"" – 4:26
"" – 4:36
" -Turner's Steamroller-" – 4:34
"" – 4:39
"Tokyo's a Lonely Town" (Vincent Poncia Jr., Pete Andreoli, lyrics adaptations by Yamashita) – 2:41
"" – 1:48
"Splender" – 5:25
"Mighty Smile" (Yamashita, Mariya Takeuchi) – 3:14 
" "Queen of Hype" Blues" – 5:15
"Endless Game" – 4:10
"Groovin'" (Felix Cavaliere, Eddie Brigati) – 3:20

Bonus tracks for 30th Anniversary Edition
"Morning Shine (モーニング・シャイン)" – 4:21
"Atom no Ko" (アトムの子, Atomu no Ko)" [Remix version] – 4:28
"Sayonara Natsu no Hi (さよなら夏の日)" [Alternate vocal version] – 4:35
"Turner no Kikansha (ターナーの汽罐車, Tānā no Kikansha) -Turner's Steamroller-" [Single version] – 4:33
"Sayonara Natsu no Hi (さよなら夏の日)" [Original karaoke] – 4:36
"Endless Game" [Original karaoke] – 4:08

Personnel
Tatsuro Yamashita – Lead and backing vocals, electric guitar, acoustic guitar, acoustic piano, electric sitar, synthesizer, hammond organ, glocken, percussion, hand bells, drum programming, computer programming, effect
Kouki Itou – Electric bass
Hiroyuki Nanba – Acoustic piano
Masato Matsuda – Acoustic piano
Tōru Shigemi – Synthesizer
Jun Aoyama – Drums
Motoya Hamaguchi – Percussion
Shin Kazuhara – Trumpet
Yasuo Hirauchi – Trombone
Jake H Conception Tenor sax
Satoru Hirahara – Baritone sax
Tadanori Kogawa – Trombone
Mariya Takeuchi – Background vocals
Kazuhito Murata – Background vocals
Masamichi Sugi – Background vocals

Awards

Chart positions

Album

Singles

Release history

References

1991 albums
Tatsuro Yamashita albums